John Berdan (December 16, 1798 – October 11, 1841) was the 1st mayor of Toledo, Ohio and served two terms in office from 1837 to 1839.

Berdan was born in New York City and lived in Brunswick, Ohio until he moved to Toledo in 1835.

Beside his civic duties he was a local businessman and served as Associate Judge of the Court of Common Pleas for Lucas County from 1839 to 1841.

Legacy

In 1901 the Berdan Building opened and was named after the city's first mayor.

References

1798 births
1841 deaths
Mayors of Toledo, Ohio
Politicians from New York City
19th-century American politicians
People from Brunswick, Ohio